Alida Rossander (1843-1909) was a Swedish educator, mathematician, women's rights activist and bank clerk official.  In 1864, she became the first female bank clerk official in Sweden.

She and her sister Jenny Rossander were students of the pioneering Lärokurs för fruntimmer in 1859, were among the first teachers employed when it was transformed to the Högre lärarinneseminariet in 1861, and were fired by Jane Miller Thengberg when the school was given an organized structure in 1864, and in 1865 they became the founders and managers of the Rossander Course.

References

Further reading 
  

1843 births
1909 deaths
19th-century Swedish educators
19th-century Swedish women
Swedish mathematicians
Swedish women mathematicians
Mathematics educators